Jalan Kebun (Selangor state route 14) is a major road in Shah Alam, Selangor, Malaysia.

List of junctions

Roads in Selangor